BNS Jamuna  is a Meghna Class Patrol Vessel of the Bangladesh Navy that joined in 1985.

Career

BNS Jamuna is serving under the command of the Commodore Commanding BN Flotilla (COMBAN).

Armament

The ship is armed with a 57mm 70-cal Bofors DP gun that can fire 200 rds/min to 17 km (9.3 n miles) carrying 2.4 kg. shell and a 40mm 70-cal Bofors AA gun firing 300rds/min to 12 km (6.5 n miles) with 0.96 kg.shell. Besides there are two 7.62mm machine guns as secondary weapons.

See also
BNS Meghna
List of active ships of the Bangladesh Navy

References

1984 ships
Ships built in Singapore
Patrol vessels of the Bangladesh Navy